Tim Prentice may refer to:

Tim Prentice (designer) (born 1964), American industrial designer
Tim Prentice (sculptor), American sculptor